Mudathir Yahya (born 6 May 1996) is a Tanzanian football player who plays a central midfielder. He currently plays for Yanga. He was unveiled by Yanga on 3 January 2023.

Yahya is a member of both the Tanzania national football team and the Zanzibar. He appeared for the latter at the 2017 CECAFA Cup, where his side finished runner-up.

References

1995 births
Living people
Tanzanian footballers
Zanzibari footballers
Tanzania international footballers
Zanzibar international footballers
Dual internationalists (football)
Azam F.C. players
Association football midfielders
2019 Africa Cup of Nations players
Tanzania youth international footballers